Marie Söderström-Lundberg (born 21 October 1960) is a Swedish long-distance runner. In 2001, she competed in the women's marathon at the 2001 World Championships in Athletics held in Edmonton, Alberta, Canada. She finished in 24th place.

In 1999, she competed in the women's marathon at the 1999 World Championships in Athletics held in Seville, Spain. She finished in 18th place. In 2003, she competed in the women's marathon at the 2003 World Championships in Athletics held in Paris, France. She finished in 26th place.

References

External links 
 

Living people
1960 births
Place of birth missing (living people)
Swedish female long-distance runners
Swedish female marathon runners
World Athletics Championships athletes for Sweden
20th-century Swedish women
21st-century Swedish women